Whittingham is a locality in the Singleton Council region of New South Wales, Australia.

Whittingham Post Office opened on 16 June 1879 and closed on 31 July 1948.

Whittingham Public School opened in August 1881 and closed in December 1983.

Whittingham railway station opened on 6 September 1869 as Falkiner's Platform. It was renamed Whittingham in February 1877. It closed at an unknown date and has been demolished.

The Whittingham Anglican Cemetery is located on Cemetery Road and continues to be maintained by the Anglican Church.

The E.C. Throsby Pty Ltd abattoir is located at Whittingham.

Heritage listings
Whittingham has a number of heritage-listed sites, including:

 Minimbah House
 Neotsfield Lane: Neotsfield

References

 
Localities in New South Wales
Singleton Council